Wason Libardo Rentería Cuesta (born 4 July 1985) is a Colombian professional footballer who plays as a striker.

Club career
Born in Quibdó, Rentería began playing professionally with Boyacá Chicó in 2004. The following year, he was included in the Colombian team that took part in the 2005 FIFA World Youth Championship.

After his performances with under-20s, Rentería was transferred to Sport Club Internacional in Brazil. He showed his flair there, usually coming off the bench to score goals in a series of pivotal situations, the first being one that earned a quarter-final berth in the 2006 edition of the Copa Libertadores which the club would eventually win, at Uruguay's Club Nacional de Football – he hit the ball over an oncoming defender's head with his right foot and first timed it past the goalkeeper with his left one; despite often playing backup to Rafael Sobis, who would then move to Real Betis, he became an important attacking element and a fan favourite.

Rentería's form was, however, cut short by a series of injuries that left him out of the side subsequently. In the 2007 January transfer window he signed for FC Porto in Portugal for R$7,457,400, but all of the fee belonged to a third-party owner; in reverse, International had to pay an additional commission to the football broker. Porto, on the other hand, re-sold 50% of its economic rights on any future transfer.

Rentería appeared rarely for the eventual champions – six matches, five as a substitute – and was sent on loan to RC Strasbourg seven months later. In spite of his nine Ligue 1 goals (squad best), they finished second from the bottom and he returned to Porto, being immediately loaned to fellow Primeira Liga side S.C. Braga; he was an undisputed starter throughout his first and only campaign, often partnering Albert Meyong, and also netted three goals in the Minho team's round-of-16 run in the UEFA Cup.

Porto would loan Rentería again for 2009–10, as he joined Clube Atlético Mineiro on 22 July 2009. However, in January 2010 he moved clubs again – still loaned – returning to league leaders Braga who would eventually finish second.

In January 2011, Rentería returned to his country after a six-year absence, signing with Once Caldas from Manizales and going on to score on a regular basis. In June, however, he joined Mexico's Cruz Azul for three years; however, just days after arriving, he rescinded his contract after failing his medical.

Subsequently, Rentería returned to Brazil and signed with Sociedade Esportiva e Recreativa Caxias do Sul, being loaned to Santos FC until December 2011 or June 2012.

International career
Rentería represented Colombia at under-17, under-20 and senior levels. He made his full debut in 2005, and appeared for the nation at the 2005 CONCACAF Gold Cup.

International goals
Scores and results list Colombia's goal tally first, score column indicates score after each Rentería goal.

Personal life
Rentería's younger brother, Carlos, is also a footballer and a striker. Amongst others, he played for Atlético Nacional.

References

External links

1985 births
Living people
People from Quibdó
Colombian footballers
Association football forwards
Categoría Primera A players
Boyacá Chicó F.C. footballers
Once Caldas footballers
Millonarios F.C. players
La Equidad footballers
Campeonato Brasileiro Série A players
Campeonato Brasileiro Série B players
Sport Club Internacional players
Clube Atlético Mineiro players
Sociedade Esportiva e Recreativa Caxias do Sul players
Santos FC players
Guarani FC players
Primeira Liga players
FC Porto players
S.C. Braga players
Ligue 1 players
RC Strasbourg Alsace players
Argentine Primera División players
Racing Club de Avellaneda footballers
Colombia under-20 international footballers
Colombia international footballers
2005 CONCACAF Gold Cup players
Colombian expatriate footballers
Expatriate footballers in Brazil
Expatriate footballers in Portugal
Expatriate footballers in France
Expatriate footballers in Argentina
Colombian expatriate sportspeople in Brazil
Colombian expatriate sportspeople in Portugal
Colombian expatriate sportspeople in France
Colombian expatriate sportspeople in Argentina
Sportspeople from Chocó Department